The 2001 All-Ireland Minor Football Championship was the 70th staging of the All-Ireland Minor Football Championship, the Gaelic Athletic Association's premier inter-county Gaelic football tournament for boys under the age of 18.

Cork entered the championship as defending champions, however, they were defeated by Kerry in the Munster final.

On 29 September 2001, Tyrone won the championship following a 2-11 to 0-6 defeat of Dublin in the All-Ireland final. This was their fifth All-Ireland title overall and their first in three championship seasons.

Results

Connacht Minor Football Championship

Quarter-final

Semi-finals

Final

Leinster Minor Football Championship

Preliminary round

Quarter-finals

Semi-finals

Final

Munster Minor Football Championship

Rob robin

Play offSemi-finalsFinalUlster Minor Football ChampionshipRob robinSemi-finalFinalAll-Ireland Minor Football ChampionshipSemi-finalsFinal'''

References

2001
All-Ireland Minor Football Championship